Makati Tuscany is a 27-storey residential building in Ayala Avenue, in Makati beside Discovery Primea. It was completed in 1976.

References

See also
 List of tallest buildings in Metro Manila

Buildings and structures in Makati
Residential condominiums in Metro Manila